Save My Life: Boston Trauma (referred to on-air simply by its prefix title) is a medical documentary series on ABC, which premiered on July 19, 2015. It follows the medical staff of three hospitals specializing in trauma care in Boston, Massachusetts – the Boston Medical Center, Massachusetts General Hospital, and Brigham and Women's Hospital – and the patients being treated in those facilities. The series is produced by ABC News through its production subsidiary Lincoln Square Productions, and is part of the production company's True Medicine documentary format.

Episodes

References

External links

2015 American television series debuts
2015 American television series endings
2010s American documentary television series
American Broadcasting Company original programming
English-language television shows
2010s American medical television series
Television shows set in Boston
Television shows filmed in Boston